Vladimir Sergeyevich Zuev (also Volodymyr Serhiyovych Zuev, born 11 May 1985) is a Ukrainian former competitive ice dancer. With Alla Beknazarova, he is a two-time Ukrainian national champion.

Career 
Zuev skated with Oksana Dejneka early in his career.

In 2003, Zuev began competing with Alla Beknazarova. They won a gold medal at the 2005 Ondrej Nepela Memorial and four international bronze medals — at the 2007 Nebelhorn Trophy, 2009 Winter Universiade, and 2009 Finlandia Trophy. They competed at one World Junior Championships, one senior World Championships, and four European Championships. Their best result, 11th, came at the 2010 European Championships.

Programs 
(with Beknazarova)

Results 
(with Beknazarova)

References

External links 

 

Ukrainian male ice dancers
1985 births
Living people
Sportspeople from Kharkiv
Universiade medalists in figure skating
Universiade bronze medalists for Ukraine
Competitors at the 2005 Winter Universiade
Competitors at the 2009 Winter Universiade